Latte e Miele  is an Italian progressive rock musical group.

The group formed in 1971 in Genoa. In  1972 they realized  their most famous work, the concept album  Passio secundum Mattheum, with part of music inspired by Johann Sebastian Bach  and recitatives from the Gospel of Matthew.  After having opened the concerts of Van der Graaf Generator, in 1973 they released another concept album, Papillon, and disbanded in 1974. 
 
The group reformed in 1976, with only Alfio Vitanza from the original line-up, and with the name of the group spelled as "LatteMiele". After the album  Aquile e scoiattoli, best known for its 23-minutes-suite "Pavana", they gradually abandoned the progressive style and approached pop-rock. After disbanding in the early 1980s, the original line-up reunited in 2008.

Members

Current members
 Oliviero Lacagnina - keyboards, piano, vocals (1972-1975, 2008–present)
 Giancarlo Marcello Dellacasa - guitar, bass guitar, vocals (1972-1975, 2008–present)
 Alfio Vitanza - drums, flute, vocals (1972-1980, 2008–present)
 Massimo Gori - bass guitar, guitar, vocals (1975-1980, 2008–present)

Former Members
 Mimmo Damiani - keyboards, guitar, vocals (1975-1976)
 Luciano Poltini - keyboards, vocals (1975-1980, 2011)
 Dario Carlevaro - bass guitar (1980)
 Pino Nastasi - keyboards, programming, backing vocals (2008-2011)

Discography 

Albums 
     1972 - Passio Secundum Mattheum  
     1973 - Papillon  
     1976 - Aquile e scoiattoli  
     1992 - Papillon: English version - recorded in 1973 
     1992 - Latte e Miele Live - recorded in 1974  
     1992 - Vampyrs - recorded in 1979  
     2008 - Live Tasting '
     2009 - Marco Polo - Sogni e viaggi      2014 - Passio Secundum Mattheum - The Complete Work'' 

Singles  
     1972 - Getzemani/Il re dei Giudei  
     1974 - Rimani nella mia vita/Patetica  
     1974 - Mese di maggio/Tanto amore  
     1976 - Un silenzio diviso in due/Per poter vivere 
     1976 - Un mattino/Pavana 
     1978 - Sto volando con te/Restiamo insieme  
     1979 - Fiore di strada/Severamente proibito  
     1980 - Ritagli di luce/Metro

References

External links

 Latte e Miele at Discogs

Musical groups established in 1971
Italian rock music groups
Italian progressive rock groups
Musical groups from Liguria